Here Comes Garfield is a 1982 animated television special based on the comic strip Garfield by Jim Davis. It was the first half-hour Garfield TV special. It is directed by Phil Roman and features Lorenzo Music as the voice of Garfield the house cat, as well as the voices of Sandy Kenyon, Henry Corden and Gregg Berger.

The special was first broadcast October 25, 1982 on CBS. It was a Nielsen ratings success and was nominated for two Emmy Awards. It was accompanied by a soundtrack album and a children's book adaptation and has been released on VHS and DVD.

This is the first of twelve Garfield television specials made between 1982 and 1991.

Plot 
Garfield and Odie are outside harassing a neighbor's dog when the owner, Hubert, angrily calls the pound to capture them. When the dogcatcher arrives, Garfield flees, but Odie is too stupid to flee and is captured. When Garfield goes home, he is unable to tell Jon Arbuckle that Odie is in peril. Garfield realizes how boring his life is without Odie around, so he decides to rescue him from the pound. Although Garfield successfully makes it to the pound, the dogcatcher captures him and later puts him behind bars. Garfield learns from another cat, Fast Eddie, that Odie is going to be euthanized the next day.

During the night, Garfield has a series of flashbacks of all the good times that he and Odie played together throughout their lives. The next day, Garfield tearfully watches the dogcatcher taking Odie down the hall to be euthanized. Meanwhile, a girl arrives at the pound for a pet and chooses Garfield. Garfield manages to see his chance to escape and when the cell finally opens, he runs out the cell and past the girl. The rest of the animals flood out of the cell after Garfield. Garfield rescues Odie from the dogcatcher by biting his hand. Garfield, Odie, and the other animals escape from the pound by knocking down the door on the dogcatcher, who tries to stop them from escaping.

As the animals run to freedom, Garfield and Odie return to Jon's house, where they knock down its front door while Jon tries to fix it. Jon bets that Garfield and Odie were having fun during the night "singing on the fence, chasing cars," while he sat home and was worried himself sick about them. Garfield and Odie are bemused and they agree with Jon. At breakfast time, things return to normal as Garfield derides Odie's begging at the table, but he decides to try it himself after seeing Odie get a steak from Jon. All Garfield gets from Jon is a plate of bacon and eggs, in which he angrily throws back in to Jon's face and admitting: "I'm only human".

Voice cast

Soundtrack 

A soundtrack album for Here Comes Garfield was released on LP and cassette on Epic Records in 1982. It featured songs from and inspired by the television special, composed by Ed Bogas and Desirée Goyette and performed by Goyette and Lou Rawls. Some of these songs were released in re-recorded versions on the 1991 Am I Cool or What? album.

Track list 
 "Here Comes Garfield" (Lou Rawls)
 "Move Me" (Desirée Goyette)
 "Foolin' Around" (Lou Rawls and Desirée Goyette)
 "Long About Midnight" (Lou Rawls)
 "Big Fat Hairy Deal" (Lou Rawls)
 "Up On a Fence" (Desirée Goyette)
 "Life Is Just a Roller Coaster" (Lou Rawls)
 "So Long Old Friend" (Desirée Goyette)
 "Together Again" (Lou Rawls and Desirée Goyette)
 "Here Comes Garfield (Reprise)" (Desirée Goyette)

Production 

Here Comes Garfield was Garfield creator Jim Davis' first television special, coming after his 1980 book Garfield At Large topped The New York Times bestsellers list. For the opening sequence, Garfield dances to the theme song. In 1981, Davis was working in a California studio on how to convincingly depict this, as in previous comics, the fictional cat always walked on all four feet. Peanuts creator Charles M. Schulz was in the same studio that day, and redrew Davis' work, advising him, "The problem is, you've made Garfield's feet too small. Little tiny cat feet". Peanuts TV special producers Bill Melendez and Lee Mendelson also produced Here Comes Garfield, a consequence of the two comics sharing the same syndicate, United Media.

Lou Rawls, who had just completed a USO tour at army bases, joined the Garfield franchise with this project, and finished recording the soundtrack in mid-1982. He explained his decision, "I figured if Bill Cosby could do Fat Albert and the Cosby Kids and live forever on the earnings, why can't I do Garfield?"

Besides her contribution to the music, Desirée Goyette was also the performance model for Garfield's dance during the title song.

Broadcast and release 
Here Comes Garfield was first aired by CBS, on October 25, 1982, along with the 1966 Peanuts special It's the Great Pumpkin, Charlie Brown. It was viewed by an audience of 50 million people. This was considered a good rating, leading to speculation CBS could launch a successful series of Garfield specials similar to the Peanuts specials.

Ballantine Books published a 64-page illustrated book adaptation in September 1982. In July 2004, Here Comes Garfield was released on the DVD Garfield as Himself, along with Garfield on the Town (1983) and Garfield Gets a Life (1991).

Reception 
At the 35th Primetime Emmy Awards in 1983, Here Comes Garfield was nominated for the Primetime Emmy Award for Outstanding Animated Program and Phil Roman was nominated for the Outstanding Individual Achievement in Animated Programming. In 2004, DVD Talk critic Randy Miller judged the Garfield as Himself specials to be "quite enjoyable," highlighting "a daring dog pound rescue". The DVD debuted 35th in sales.

References

External links 
 
 

1980s American television specials
1980s animated television specials
1982 in American television
1982 television specials
1980s American animated films
CBS television specials
CBS original programming
Television shows directed by Phil Roman
Garfield television specials
Television shows written by Jim Davis (cartoonist)